Elections to Ards Borough Council were held on 17 May 1989 on the same day as the other Northern Irish local government elections. The election used three district electoral areas to elect a total of 20 councillors.

Election results

Note: "Votes" are the first preference votes.

Districts summary

|- class="unsortable" align="centre"
!rowspan=2 align="left"|Ward
! % 
!Cllrs
! % 
!Cllrs
! %
!Cllrs
! %
!Cllrs
!rowspan=2|TotalCllrs
|- class="unsortable" align="center"
!colspan=2 bgcolor="" | UUP
!colspan=2 bgcolor="" | DUP
!colspan=2 bgcolor="" | Alliance
!colspan=2 bgcolor="white"| Others
|-
|align="left"|Ards Peninsula
|bgcolor="40BFF5"|38.3
|bgcolor="40BFF5"|3
|30.0
|2
|23.6
|2
|8.1
|0
|7
|-
|align="left"|Ards West
|bgcolor="40BFF5"|54.5
|bgcolor="40BFF5"|3
|27.8
|2
|17.6
|1
|0.0
|0
|6
|-
|align="left"|Newtownards
|32.1
|2
|bgcolor="#D46A4C"|38.9
|bgcolor="#D46A4C"|3
|14.7
|1
|14.3
|1
|7
|-
|- class="unsortable" class="sortbottom" style="background:#C9C9C9"
|align="left"| Total
|41.3
|8
|32.2
|7
|18.8
|4
|7.7
|1
|20
|-
|}

Districts results

Ards Peninsula

1985: 2 x UUP, 2 x DUP, 1 x Alliance, 1 x UPUP, 1 x Independent
1989: 3 x UUP, 2 x DUP, 2 x Alliance
1985-1989 Change: UUP and Alliance gain from UPUP and Independent

Ards West

1985: 3 x DUP, 2 x UUP, 1 x Alliance
1989: 3 x UUP, 2 x DUP, 1 x Alliance
1985-1989 Change: UUP gain from DUP

Newtownards

1985: 3 x DUP, 2 x UUP, 1 x Alliance, 1 x NILP
1989: 3 x DUP, 2 x UUP, 1 x Alliance, 1 x Independent Unionist
1985-1989 Change: Independent Unionist gain from NILP

References

Ards Borough Council elections
Ards